Howard Clifford "Bully" Gilstrap was a college men's basketball and college football coach. He was the head coach of the Texas basketball program from 1942 to 1945. He coached the Longhorns to a 43–28 record, playing in one NCAA tournament and reaching the NCAA Final Four in 1943.  Gilstrap also served as an assistant coach on the Longhorns football team for 20 seasons, from 1937 through 1956.  He was an athlete at Texas, playing football, basketball and track and field.  He was inducted into the University of Texas Athletics Hall of Honor in 1968.

Gilstrap was the brother of coach and athletic administrator Chena Gilstrap.

Head coaching record

Basketball

See also
 List of NCAA Division I Men's Final Four appearances by coach

References

Date of birth unknown
Date of death unknown
American men's basketball coaches
American men's basketball players
Basketball coaches from Texas
Basketball players from Texas
People from Taylor, Texas
Schreiner Mountaineers football coaches
Texas Longhorns football coaches
Texas Longhorns football players
Texas Longhorns men's basketball coaches
Texas Longhorns men's basketball players